Álvaro Montoya (born February 13, 1985) is an American former professional ice hockey goaltender. He played for parts of nine seasons in the National Hockey League (NHL) as a member of the Arizona Coyotes, New York Islanders, Winnipeg Jets, Florida Panthers, Montreal Canadiens, and Edmonton Oilers. He was drafted by the New York Rangers in the first round, sixth overall, in the 2004 NHL Entry Draft after a three-year career with the University of Michigan. Montoya is the first Cuban-American to play in the NHL. Montoya was born in Chicago, Illinois, but grew up in nearby Glenview, Illinois.

Playing career

As a youth, Montoya played in the 1999 Quebec International Pee-Wee Hockey Tournament with the Chicago Young Americans minor ice hockey team. He later played for the Loyola Academy, and the Texas Tornado of the North American Hockey League (NAHL).

Montoya spent the 2000–01 season with the U.S. National Team Development Program. Montoya began attending the University of Michigan and playing for the Wolverines ice hockey team in 2002–03. He enjoyed success at Michigan, especially during his final season in 2004–05, where he posted a record of 30–7–3. Montoya twice represented the United States at the World Junior Ice Hockey Championships, backstopping the team to its first gold medal at the 2004 tournament in Finland; he was named to the tournament All-Star team. The 2005 tournament, hosted by the United States, was a disappointing one for Montoya and the U.S., as they failed to earn a medal, losing to the Czech Republic in the bronze medal game.

Early NHL career
After being signed by the New York Rangers to a three-year entry-level contract in the summer of 2005, Montoya made his professional debut with the Hartford Wolf Pack of the American Hockey League (AHL), the team with which he spent the majority of the next three seasons. Overall, he posted a 66–34–4 record with the Wolf Pack, along with a 5–5 playoff record.

With the emergence of Henrik Lundqvist as an All-Star caliber goaltender, Montoya became expendable to the Rangers. On February 26, 2008, Montoya was traded to the Phoenix Coyotes, along with Marcel Hossa, in exchange for Fredrik Sjöström, David LeNeveu and Josh Gratton.

After re-signing with the Coyotes on July 2, 2008, Montoya started the 2008–09 season with the San Antonio Rampage, the Coyotes' AHL affiliate. Later that season, on April 1, 2009, Montoya made his NHL debut with the Coyotes, recording a shutout in a 3–0 victory over the Colorado Avalanche. He went on to appear in five games for the Coyotes in 2008–09, posting a 3–1 record. That spring, Montoya was named to the American roster for the 2009 IIHF World Championship in Switzerland. He started one game at the tournament, a 6–2 win over France.

On February 9, 2011, Montoya was traded to the New York Islanders in exchange for a sixth-round draft pick in 2011. With Islanders' goaltenders Rick DiPietro and Kevin Poulin sidelined with injuries, Montoya was provided with an opportunity to play regularly in the NHL for the first time. He went on to play 21 games for the Islanders, posting a 9–5–5 record with a .921 save percentage and one shutout. On March 29, the Islanders re-signed Montoya to a one-year contract extension. Montoya recorded a 9–11–5 record during the 2011–12 season.

Montoya again represented the United States at the 2011 World Championship. He appeared in four games and posted a 2–1 record as the Americans finished a disappointing eighth overall.

Winnipeg Jets and Florida Panthers
On July 4, 2012, Montoya was signed by the Winnipeg Jets to back-up starter Ondřej Pavelec on a one-year contract for the 2012–13 season, worth $601,000 after being released by the New York Islanders.

On July 1, 2014, Montoya was signed as a free agent by the Florida Panthers to a two-year contract with an annual salary of $1.05 million.

Montreal Canadiens and Edmonton Oilers
On July 1, 2016, Montoya was signed as a free agent by the Montreal Canadiens to a one-year contract with an annual salary of $950,000. He was the backup to starter Carey Price. During a November 2016 game against the Columbus Blue Jackets, Montoya allowed 10 goals in a 10-0 Canadiens loss, making it the largest margin of losing by Montreal since December 1995. He kept a positive attitude about the embarrassing loss, saying that the setback only made him stronger.

On January 2, 2017, Montoya signed a new two-year contract to last until 2019.

On January 4, 2018, the Canadiens traded Montoya to the Edmonton Oilers in exchange for a conditional fourth-round pick in the 2018 NHL Entry Draft.

Post-Playing Career

On September 9, 2021, Montoya was named director of community outreach for the Dallas Stars.

Career statistics

Regular season and playoffs

International

Awards and honours

References

External links

1985 births
American men's ice hockey goaltenders
American people of Cuban descent
Bakersfield Condors players
Charlotte Checkers (1993–2010) players
Edmonton Oilers players
Florida Panthers players
Hartford Wolf Pack players
Ice hockey people from Chicago
Living people
Michigan Wolverines men's ice hockey players
Montreal Canadiens players
National Hockey League first-round draft picks
New York Islanders players
New York Rangers draft picks
People from Glenview, Illinois
Phoenix Coyotes players
San Antonio Rampage players
Texas Tornado players
USA Hockey National Team Development Program players
Winnipeg Jets players
AHCA Division I men's ice hockey All-Americans